All of Us is a 2022 debut play by Francesca Martinez.

Plot 
Jess, a therapist with cerebral palsy, is taking care of her vulnerable disabled clients due to the effects of austerity.

Productions 
All of Us had its opening night in the Dorfman Theatre at the National Theatre, London, on 4 August 2022, following previews from 27 July. It will play a limited run to 24 September.

Cast and characters

See also 
Ableism

External links 
Official homepage

References 

2022 plays
Plays and musicals about disability
British plays